UFC 70: Nations Collide was the second UFC event held in the United Kingdom, and the first in Manchester on Saturday, 21 April 2007. UFC 70 was also only the seventh UFC event held outside the United States, and the first since UFC 38. The card was broadcast live on pay-per-view in the United Kingdom and Ireland on Setanta Sports.

The televised card on Spike TV drew a 1.84 overall rating (2.8 million viewers), and at its highest point, UFC 70 drew 3.5 million viewers for the main event.

Background
2006 PRIDE Open-Weight Grand Prix Champion, Mirko Cro Cop fought Heavyweight contender Gabriel Gonzaga in the main event to determine the top contender for the UFC Heavyweight Championship held by Randy Couture.

The card also featured Michael Bisping fighting in England for the UFC for the first time against UFC veteran Elvis Sinosic and Andrei Arlovski taking on prize fighter and training partner of Mirko Cro Cop and future UFC Heavyweight Champion Fabrício Werdum, who was making his UFC debut.

Reports have indicated that the UFC was targeting this event for its debut on HBO, but negotiations with HBO were not completed in time for UFC 70. As a result, the card instead aired on Spike TV in North America at 9 pm EDT on a 6-hour tape delay.

Lyoto Machida was originally scheduled to fight Forrest Griffin at this event, but Griffin became ill with a staph infection and could not compete on the card.

Results

Bonus awards

The bonuses for this event were $30,000 each.

Fight of the Night: Michael Bisping vs. Elvis Sinosic
Knockout of the Night: Gabriel Gonzaga
Submission of the Night: Terry Etim

See also
 Ultimate Fighting Championship
 List of UFC champions
 List of UFC events
 2007 in UFC

References

External links

Official UFC 70 fight card
Official UFC 70 website
UFC 70: Minute By Minute Review

Ultimate Fighting Championship events
2007 in mixed martial arts
Mixed martial arts in the United Kingdom
Sports competitions in Manchester
2007 in England